Robert William Ashburnham Swannell  (born November 1950). is a British businessman and former banker, and the chairman of Marks & Spencer from 2011 until September 2017.

Career
Swannell worked in investment banking for 33 years with Schroders and Citigroup.

He has been the chairman of Marks & Spencer since January 2011. In September 2017, he was succeeded by Archie Norman.

He was recognised in the 2018 New Year's Honours List where he was made a CBE.

Personal life
Swannell lives in England.

References

1950 births
Commanders of the Order of the British Empire
Living people
Schroders people
Marks & Spencer people
Citigroup people
British bankers